This list of University of Pittsburgh alumni includes notable graduates, non-graduate former students, and current students of the University of Pittsburgh, a state-related research university located in Pittsburgh, Pennsylvania, United States.

Arts and entertainment 

 Dilruba Ahmed - Bangladeshi poet and author
 Geri Allen (A&S 1983G, faculty) – jazz composer, educator, and pianist
 Hervey Allen (1915) – author, best known for Anthony Adverse
 Olivia Anakwe (did not graduate) – fashion model 
 Joseph Bathanti (A&S 1976) – poet, writer, professor; NC Poet Laureate, 2012–2014
 Peter Beagle (A&S 1959) – Hugo Award-winning fantasist and author of novels, nonfiction, and screenplays
 Jeff Bergman (A&S 1983) – voice actor who provides modern-day voices of classic cartoon characters including Bugs Bunny and Daffy Duck
 DJ Bonics (2002, real name Brandon Glova) – a hip hop DJ for Wiz Khalifa and radio DJ.
 Mark Bulwinkle (BFA 1968) – graphic artist and sculptor<ref name=honolulu11>Honolulu Museum of Art, Spalding House: Self-guided Tour, Sculpture Garden, p. 19</ref>
 Michael Chabon (A&S 1984) – Pulitzer Prize-winning author of The Amazing Adventures of Kavalier & Clay, The Yiddish Policemen's Union, and The Mysteries of Pittsburgh Murray Chass (A&S 1960) – award-winning baseball journalist for The New York Times Bill Cullen – host of many television game shows
 Virginia Cuthbert (MFA 1934) – artist
 Stephen Dau – writer
 Jim Donovan – professional drummer and percussionist, best known as the former drummer and one of the founding members of the band Rusted Root
 Morton Fine (MA, English) - screenwriter/producer, winner of the Writers Guild of America Award for The Pawnbroker
 Sharon G. Flake (A&S 1978) – award-winning author of young adult literature
 Jack Gilbert (A&S 1954) – award-winning poet
 Lester Goran (A&S 1951, MA 1961) – author
 Gabbie Hanna (A&S 2013) – YouTuber, singer-songwriter, author, & internet personality
 Ernie Hawkins (A&S 1973; degree in philosophy) – blues guitarist and singer
 Terrance Hayes (MFA 1997, faculty 2013–present) – poet whose books have won National Book Award for Poetry and National Poetry Series
 Samuel John Hazo (A&S 1957G) – novelist, playwright, first poet laureate of Commonwealth of Pennsylvania
 Paul Hertneky – writer
 Frederick A. Hetzel – University Press publisher
 Eddie Ifft – stand-up comedian, athlete (track and field, cross country)
 John Irving – author of The Cider House Rules and The World According to Garp; recipient of an Academy Award for Best Adapted Screenplay and a National Book Award for Fiction (did not graduate)
 Nicole Johnson (Public Health 2007) – Miss America 1999 and diabetes advocate
 Gene Kelly (A&S 1933) – Academy Award-winning dancer, actor, singer, film director, producer and choreographer, perhaps best known for performance in Singin' in the Rain
 Chris Kuzneski (A&S 1991, MEDU 1993) – New York Times best-selling author
 Jeanne Marie Laskas (MFA) – award-winning columnist, journalist, and author
 Lorin Maazel (A&S 1954) – conductor, violinist, and composer, New York Philharmonic
 Herb Magidson – lyricist, won first Academy Award for Best Original Song, in 1934
 Kellee Maize – musician, rapper and hip-hop artist
 Allison McAtee (A&S 2001) – actress, model, CSI: Miami, Life, Hell Ride, Bloomington
 Bebe Moore Campbell (EDU 1971) – author and journalist
 Jenna Morasca – actress, model and winner of Survivor: The Amazon
 Thaddeus Mosley (A&S 1950) – sculptor who works mostly in wood
 Ethelbert Nevin – pianist and composer, left school after one year
 David Newell (CGS 1973) – actor, Mr. McFeely on Mister Rogers' Neighborhood
 Beth Ostrosky – model, actress, and wife of Howard Stern
 Barbara Paul (PhD) – writer
 Ed Roberson (A&S 1970, faculty) – award-winning poet
 Leo Robin (law degree) – composer and songwriter
 Fred Rogers – host of Mister Rogers' Neighborhood
 Zelda Rubinstein – actress best known for Poltergeist, earned bachelor's degree in bacteriology
 Neal Russo – sportswriter for St. Louis Post-Dispatch, Sporting News and Sports Illustrated
 Justin Sane (A&S 1998) – singer, guitarist of punk band Anti-Flag
 Julie Sokolow (A&S 2010) – documentary filmmaker, musician, and writer
Jack Stauber – YouTuber, singer-songwriter, and animator most well known for his song "Buttercup" and Adult Swim collaborations
 Robert Sterling – actor best known for Topper
 Gerald Stern (BA, English) – National Book Award-winning poet
 Bill Strickland – founder of Manchester Craftsmen's Guild, an agency that inspires teenagers through the arts; board member of National Endowment for the Arts; awarded MacArthur prize
 Benjamin Tatar (Bachelor's degree in English and drama) – actor
 Alaska Thunderfuck (AS) (real name Justin Honard) – drag performer, musician, winner of RuPaul's Drag Race: All Stars
 Regis Toomey (A&S 1921) – motion picture and television actor who appeared in over 180 films
 Jerome "Jero" White – Japanese pop artist known for fusion of hip-hop and enka
 August Wilson (honorary, Board of Trustees member) – 1987 Pulitzer Prize-winning playwright who wrote about African-American experience in the 20th century
 Wang Xiaobo (MS) – writer

Athletics 

 Steven Adams – NBA starting center for Memphis Grizzlies
 Britt Baker (DMD, 2018) – professional wrestler currently signed with All Elite Wrestling
 Adam Bisnowaty – NFL football player for Carolina Panthers
 DeJuan Blair – power forward for Dallas Mavericks; consensus first-team basketball All-American in 2008–09
 Matthew Bloom – professional wrestler and San Diego Chargers football player
 Antonio Bryant – wide receiver for Tampa Bay Buccaneers and Fred Biletnikoff Award winner
 Clifford Carlson – Pitt basketball head coach, two national championships and one Final Four team ("Doc" Carlson received MD from Pitt)
 James Conner – Running back for the Arizona Cardinals
 Jason Conti – Major League Baseball player
 Beano Cook – ABC Sports and ESPN sports commentator
 Myron Cope – Hall of Fame Pittsburgh Steelers broadcaster
 Mike Ditka – football player for Pitt and Chicago Bears, NFL coach, broadcaster, member of Pro Football Hall of Fame
 Aaron Donald – All-pro defensive end for the Los Angeles Rams
 Tony Dorsett – member of Pro Football Hall of Fame; Heisman Trophy, Maxwell Award, and Walter Camp Award winner
 Herb Douglas (Edu. 1948, 1950G) – bronze medalist in long jump at 1948 Summer Olympics
 Larry Fitzgerald – wide receiver for the Arizona Cardinals, Walter Camp Award and Fred Biletnikoff Award winner
 Bill Fralic – Atlanta Falcons offensive lineman, member of College Football Hall of Fame
 Marshall Goldberg (1917–2006) – two-time national champion and All-American, four-time All-Pro Chicago Cardinals running back and defensive back, member of 1947 NFL championship team, member of College Football Hall of Fame
 Aaron Gray – former center for the NBA's Detroit Pistons
 Hugh Green – pro football player; Lombardi Award, Maxwell Award, and Walter Camp Award winner

 Bobby Grier – Pitt football player, first African-American to play in Sugar Bowl
 Art Griggs – Major League Baseball player
 Russ Grimm – four-time Super Bowl-winning offensive lineman with Washington Redskins, assistant coach of Arizona Cardinals
 Damar Hamlin (Class of 2020)– safety for the Buffalo Bills
 Don Hennon – two-time All-American basketball guard and Helms Foundation Basketball Hall of Fame inductee
 Craig Heyward - NFL running back
 Dick Hoblitzel – Major League Baseball player for Cincinnati Reds and Boston Red Sox, MVP for the Reds
 Chuck Hyatt – three-time basketball All-American (1927–1930) under Coach Doc Carlson, member of Basketball Hall of Fame
 Russ Kemmerer – Major League Baseball player
 Roger Kingdom (CGS 2002) – sprinter and hurdler, two-time Olympic gold medalist, former 110 m high hurdles world record holder
 Billy Knight – ABA and NBA basketball player, GM of Atlanta Hawks
 Andy Lee, football punter for the San Francisco 49ers of the National Football League
 Dion Lewis – running back for the Tennessee Titans
 Bill Maas – defensive tackle for Kansas City Chiefs and Green Bay Packers
 Ken Macha – former Major League Baseball player and manager
 Bob Malloy – Major League Baseball pitcher
 Dan Marino – quarterback for Pitt and Miami Dolphins, member of Pro Football Hall of Fame and television commentator
 Curtis Martin – pro football running back, fourth leading rusher of all time
 Mark May – ESPN sports commentator, football player, Outland Trophy winner
 LeSean McCoy – former running back for Buffalo Bills, Kansas City Chiefs, Philadelphia Eagles, and Tampa Bay Buccaneers
 George "Doc" Medich – Major League Baseball player
 Johnny Miljus – Major League Baseball player
 Sean Miller – basketball player at Pitt and head basketball coach at Arizona
 Bill Osborn (CGS 1989) – pro footballer, scout and color analyst
 Sam Parks Jr. – pro golfer, won U.S. Open in 1935 at Oakmont
 Kenny Pickett - Pittsburgh Steelers quarterback
 Cumberland Posey (Pharm. 1915) – member of National Baseball Hall of Fame, player, manager, and team owner in Negro leagues, professional basketball player and team owner
 Darrelle Revis – defensive back for New York Jets
 Richard Rydze (MD 1975) – Olympic silver medalist in diving at 1972 Summer Olympics, men's 10 meter platform
 Joe Schmidt – NFL player and head coach of Detroit Lions, 1967–1973
 Marty Schottenheimer – head coach of four NFL teams
 Jabaal Sheard – defensive end for the Indianapolis Colts
 Trecia-Kaye Smith – long jump and triple jump, seven-time NCAA national champion, 15-time All-American, 4 national indoor titles, 2004 Olympics fourth place, 2007 IAFF Champion, named to USTF Silver Anniversary Team in 2007
 Sal Sunseri – college and professional football coach
 Jock Sutherland – Hall of Fame football coach, All-American football player; Pitt Professor of Dentistry
 Steve Swetonic – Major League Baseball player
 Joe Walton – head coach of New York Jets, 1983–1989
 Dave Wannstedt – coach for several NFL and college teams, including University of Pittsburgh
 John Woodruff (Col. 1939) – gold medalist in 800 meters at 1936 Berlin Olympics
 Sam Young – small forward for Indiana Pacers; 2008 Big East Tournament MVP

Business 

 Kevin G. McAllister (Mechanical Engineering) – EVP The Boeing Company, President & CEO Boeing Commercial Airplanes
 Walter Arnheim – Mobil Oil executive, corporate and non-profit advisor
 Susan Arnold (MBA, Katz 1980) – Vice Chairman of P&G, ranked 10th among the 50 most powerful women in business by Fortune
 George Barco (Law 1934) – cable television executive who played a key role in development of the industry
 Yolanda Barco (1949) – cable television executive
 Erik Buell (ENGR 1979) – engineer, founder and chairman of Buell Motorcycle Company, a subsidiary of Harley-Davidson
 Marc Chandler (MPIA, GSPIA 1985) – foreign exchange market analyst, writer, and speaker
 George Hubbard Clapp (Ph.B. Col. 1877) – aluminium industry pioneer
 Pat Croce (SHRS 1977) – entrepreneur, author, TV personality, and former president of the Philadelphia 76ers
 Mark Cuban (did not graduate) – businessman and investor, owner of Dallas Mavericks NBA franchise
 William S. Dietrich II (A&S 1980G, 1984G) – industrialist and philanthropist
 Ning Gaoning (MBA, Katz 1985) – Chairman of COFCO International Limited, 2009 CNBC Asia Pacific's Asia Business Leader of the Year
 Joseph A. Hardy III (ENGR 1948) – Founder and CEO of 84 Lumber and Nemacolin Woodlands Resort.
 Frances Hesselbein (UPJ) – President and CEO of Leader to Leader Institute, former CEO for the Girl Scouts of the USA, and Presidential Medal of Freedom winner
 Dawne Hickton (1983 JD degree, school of law) – vice chair, President, CEO of RTI International Metals
 Emmett Leahy (1910–1964), American archivist and entrepreneur, pioneer in the discipline of records management.
 Kevin March (CGS 1983, MBA 1984) – CFO and Senior Vice-President of Texas Instruments
 Andrew W. Mellon (1874) – banker, philanthropist, U.S. Secretary of the Treasury, university trustee, donor, and founder of the Mellon Institute of Industrial Research
 Richard B. Mellon (1876) – banker, philanthropist, university trustee, founder of Mellon Institute of Industrial Research
 Thomas Mellon (Col. 1837) – founder of Mellon Financial, judge
 Larry Merlo (Pharm BS 1978) – President and CEO of CVS Health
 Arturo C. Porzecanski (MA 1974, PhD 1975) – 2005 Legacy Laureate, pioneer in emerging markets research on Wall Street, former Chief Economist at ABN AMRO
 Al Primo (A&S 1958) – television news executive credited with creating "Eyewitness News" format
 Art Rooney II (A&S 1978) – president and co-owner of the NFL's Pittsburgh Steelers
 Brent Saunders (A&S, UCIS 1992) – CEO of Bausch & Lomb; former President of Schering-Plough Healthcare Products
 Kevin W. Sharer (MBA, Katz 1983) – Chairman of Amgen
 Jagdish Sheth (MBA 1962, PhD 1966) – internationally recognized business consultant, author and educator
 Sung Won Sohn – member of Council of Economic Advisers during Nixon administration
 John A. Swanson (ENGR PhD 1966) – founder and retired President of ANSYS, innovator of finite element simulation software and technologies designed to optimize product development processes; winner of John Fritz Medal in engineering
 Burton Tansky – President and Chief Executive Officer, The Neiman Marcus Group, Inc.
 David Tepper (A&S 1978) – speculator, hedge fund manager; gave naming donation to Tepper School of Business
 Thomas Usher (undergraduate, master's and Ph.D degrees) – Chairman of U.S. Steel and Marathon Oil; Director of Extra Mile Education Foundation and Boy Scouts of America
 David Wilstein (bachelor's degree in engineering) – real estate developer
 Tung Chao Yung – Chinese shipping magnate, founder of the Orient Overseas Line (now OOCL), and owner of the largest ship ever built

Education 
 Bowman Foster Ashe (BS 1910, faculty) – first president of University of Miami, Florida
 Stanley F. Battle (M.P.H. 1979, PhD 1980) – educator, author, activist, leader of North Carolina Agricultural and Technical State University, Coppin State University and Southern Connecticut State University
 Steven C. Beering – president emeritus, Purdue University and former Dean of the Indiana University School of Medicine
 Todd H. Bullard – former president of Potomac State College and Bethany College
 Carol A. Cartwright – president of Kent State University, 1991–2006
 Paul Russell Cutright – historian and biologist
 Claire Finkelstein, professor at the University of Pennsylvania Law School
 Christine Fulwylie-Bankston (PhD 1974) – educator, writer, civil rights activist
 Adam Herbert – president of Indiana University
 Young Woo Kang (EDUC 1973G, 1976G) – special education expert; author; former policy advisor of National Council on Disability
 Ambrose King (Yeo-Chi King) – former vice-chancellor of Chinese University of Hong Kong
 Jacqueline Liebergott – president of Emerson College
 Michael Lovell (ENGR 1989, 1991, 1994) – former chancellor of University of Wisconsin–Milwaukee, president of Marquette University
 Barry McCarty – former president of Cincinnati Christian University and national radio host
 Jay F. W. Pearson (AB, MA, faculty) – former president of University of Miami
 M. Richard Rose – former president of Alfred University and the Rochester Institute of Technology
 Brian Segal (Social Work 1971) – publisher and former President of Ryerson Polytechnical Institute and the University of Guelph
 Michael Slinger – director of law library at Widener Law, former President of ALL-SIS and Ohio Regional Association of Law Libraries
 Peter J Woolley (PhD 1989) political scientist, founder of PublicMind
 Janet Schwartz - (PhD Psychology) Behavioural Scientist, American Psychological Association Fellow

History 
 Leonard Baker (A&S 1952) – Pulitzer Prize-winning biographer
 Paul Russell Cutright (PhD, faculty) – historian and biologist
Kenneth Sacks (AB 1969) – Professor of History and Classics, Brown University

Military 

 Gust Avrakotos (A&S 1962) – CIA agent responsible for arming Afghan mujaheddin in 1980s
 Samuel W. Black (A&S 1834) – colonel, hero of Mexican and Civil wars
 Patricia Horoho (NURS 1992G) – Army's 43rd Surgeon General, commanding general of U.S. Army Medical Command
 Thomas J. Lynch (Eng 1940) – Army Air Forces lieutenant colonel and a flying ace of World War II; Distinguished Service Cross recipient
 Roscoe Robinson, Jr. (GSPIA 1965) – first African-American four-star general
 James Martinus Schoonmaker – Civil War Medal of Honor winner
 Joseph "Colonel Joe" H. Thompson (Col. 1905, Law 1908) – Medal of Honor recipient, College Football Hall of Fame inductee
 Boyd Wagner (Eng 1938) – first Army Air Forces fighter ace of World War II; Distinguished Service Cross recipient

Philosophy 
 Nancy Cartwright (A&S 1966) – MacArthur Fellowship-winning philosopher noted for her work in philosophy of science, philosophy of economics, and philosophy of physics
 Patricia Churchland (MA 1966) – 1991 MacArthur Prize-winning philosopher noted for her work in philosophy of mind and neurophilosophy; associated with a school of thought called eliminativism or eliminative materialism
 Stephen Hetherington (MA 1986; Ph.D. 1987), philosopher noted for his work in epistemology, Emeritus Professor in the School of Humanities and Languages at the University of New South Wales.
 Sandra Mitchell (PhD 1987, faculty) – professor and chair of the department of History and Philosophy of Science
 Holmes Rolston III (MS A&S 1968) – Templeton Prize-winning philosopher best known for his contributions to environmental ethics and the relationship between science and religion
 Ernest Sosa (PhD 1964) – international leader in virtue epistemology, inaugural winner of the Rescher Prize in Philosophy

Politics, law, and activism 

 Ruggero J. Aldisert – judge on United States Court of Appeals for the Third Circuit; adjunct professor at School of Law
 Anne X. Alpern (EDU 1923, Law 1927) - Pennsylvania Attorney General and Pennsylvania Supreme Court justice; first woman to serve as a state attorney general
 Hanan Al-Ahmadi (PhD 1995) - Assistant Speaker of the Consultative Assembly of Saudi Arabia
 W. Thomas Andrews (L.L.B. 1966) - Pennsylvania State Senator
 Eugene Atkinson – member of House of Representatives from Pennsylvania
 Gust Avrakotos – case officer CIA; known for massive arming of Afghan Mujahideen in 1980s in Soviet–Afghan War, chronicled in book Charlie Wilson's War: The Extraordinary Story of the Largest Covert Operation in History by George Crile
 Max Baer (A&S 1971) – Justice on Pennsylvania Supreme Court (2003–present)
 Derrick Bell (Law 1957) – law professor, first tenured black professor at Harvard Law School, dean of Oregon Law School
 Michael Bilirakis – Republican member of United States House of Representatives
 Samuel W. Black (A&S 1834) – seventh Governor of Nebraska Territory
 Frank Buchanan – Democratic member of U.S. House of Representatives and Mayor of McKeesport, Pennsylvania (1924–1928 and 1931–1942)
 Joseph Buffington (Col 1825) – two-term Whig member of the U.S. House of Representatives
 Linda Drane Burdick (A&S 1986, Law 1989) – chief assistant state attorney at Orange and Osceola County State Attorney's Office in Orlando, Florida; lead prosecutor on State of Florida vs. Casey Anthony case
 Ralph J. Cappy (A&S 1965, Law 1968) – Justice (1990–2008) and Chief Justice of Pennsylvania Supreme Court (2003–2008)
 Ben Cardin (A&S 1964) – U.S. Senator from Maryland
 Omri Ceren (A&S 2004) – political blogger
 Johnny Chiang (MPA) – Taiwanese politician who serves as the Chairman of the Kuomintang, former penultimate minister of the Government Information Office, and member of the Legislative Yuan
 Steven Choi (SIS 1976G) – mayor of Irvine, California (2012–16)
 Earl Chudoff (1932) – U.S. Representative (1949–1958)
 Robert J. Cindrich (Law 1968) – former U.S. attorney and US District judge
 David I. Cleland (A&S 1954, KGSB 1958, faculty) – engineer and educator; the "Father of Project Management"
 Bill Cobey (EDU 1968G) – former U.S. Representative from North Carolina's 4th congressional district, director of Jesse Helms Center
 Harry W. Colmery (Law 1916) – Author of G.I. Bill.
 Robert J. Corbett – Republican member of U.S. House of Representatives from Pennsylvania
 William Corbett (A&S 1924, Law 1927) – former acting governor of Guam
 Father James Cox – U.S. presidential candidate in 1932 and labor activist
 Adrian Cronauer (A&S 1959) – disc jockey, attorney, activist, basis for movie Good Morning, Vietnam; helped to found WPGH AM radio station

 Cornelius Darragh (Col. 1826) – U.S. district attorney for western district of Pennsylvania, abolitionist, Whig member of U.S. House of Representatives
 Harmar D. Denny, Jr. (1911) – U.S. Representative (1951–1953)
 Eugene A. DePasquale (MPA 1997) – Pennsylvania Auditor General
 Patrick R. Donahoe – Postmaster General
 James H. Duff (1907) – Pennsylvania Governor (1947–1951), U.S. Senator (1951–1957)
 Harry Allison Estep (1913) – U.S. Representative (1927–1933)
 Lucy Fato (1988) – corporate attorney, general counsel of AIG
 Tom Feeney (law degree) – U.S. representative
 Jay Fisette (GSPIA 1983) – member of Arlington County, Virginia's Board of Supervisors
 David Frederick – appellate attorney who has argued 21 cases in Supreme Court of the United States
 George W. Guthrie (1866) – Mayor of Pittsburgh, 1906–1909; Ambassador to Japan
 Melissa Hart (law degree) – U.S. Representative
 Orrin Hatch (law degree) – U.S. Senator
 David J. Hickton (Law 1981) – staff director and senior counsel to the House Select Subcommittee on the Coronavirus Crisis, former U.S. Attorney for the Western District of Pennsylvania, director and founder of the University of Pittsburgh Institute for Cyber Law, Policy and Security
 Janice M. Holder (A&S 1971) – first woman Chief Justice of Tennessee
 Mark R. Hornak (EDU 1978, Law 1981) – Judge for U.S. District Court
 Frank Houben – Dutch provincial governor
 K. Leroy Irvis (Law 1954) – Speaker of the Pennsylvania House of Representatives; first African American Speaker of the House of any U.S. state legislature since reconstruction
 William W. Irwin (Col 1824) – Mayor of Pittsburgh and Whig member of U.S. House of Representatives
 Mahmoud Jibril (MA 1980, PhD 1985) – head of executive team (interim prime minister) of newly formed National Transitional Council of Libyan Republic
 Judith Krug (A&S 1962) – librarian and anti-censorship activist who co-founded Banned Books Week
 William Lerach (undergraduate and law degree) – securities class-action lawyer; leading attorney in corporate and securities litigation cases including Enron, WorldCom and AOL/Time Warner
 Roslyn Litman, who successfully sued the NBA on behalf of blackballed player Connie Hawkins.
 Roozbeh Aliabadi (MPIA 2008) – advisor to Ministry of Foreign Affairs in Iran and political commentator
 Walter H. Lowrie (Col 1826, faculty 1846–1851) – chief justice of state Supreme Court
 Wangari Maathai – 2004 Nobel Peace Prize winner
 Christopher Lyman Magee (1864) – powerful 19th-century Pittsburgh political boss
 Wilson McCandless (Col 1826) – federal judge and candidate for Democratic nomination for President of the United States
 Jonas R. McClintock - 8th mayor of Pittsburgh, Pennsylvania
 Samuel J. R. McMillan (Col 1846) – Republican U.S. Senator from Minnesota
 Andrew W. Mellon (1874) – longest-serving U.S. Secretary of the Treasury (1921–1932), banker, philanthropist
 Natalie Mihalek - Republican member of the Pennsylvania House of Representatives
 Dalia Mogahed (KGSB 2004) – Muslim scholar
 Jim Moran – Democratic member of U.S. House of Representatives
 Clayton Morris (1999) – co-anchor of Fox and Friends on Fox News Channel
 John Murtha (CAS 1961) – U.S. representative, 1974–2010
 Susan Richard Nelson (Law 1978) – Judge for United States District Court for the District of Minnesota
 Dan Onorato (Law 1989) – chief executive of [[Allegheny{] County, Pennsylvania]] and former Democratic nominee for governor
 Vjosa Osmani (Law 2004) – Chairwoman of the Assembly of Kosovo, 2020–
 Ralph Pampena (M.S. in Public Administration) – Pittsburgh Police Chief, 1987–1990
 Richard Pan (Med 1991) - California State Assemblymember (2010-2014) and Senator (2015-present)
 David A. Reed (1903) – U.S. Senator (1922–1935)
 James Hay Reed (A.M. 1872) – lawyer and U.S. federal judge

 Rick Santorum (MBA) – U.S. Senator, 1995–2007
 Richard Mellon Scaife (A&S 1957) – conservative activist, newspaper publisher, philanthropist
 Elmer Eric Schattschneider – political scientist
 Bud Shuster (A&S 1954) – Republican member of U.S. House of Representatives (1973–2001)
 Richard M. Simpson – Republican member of U.S. House of Representatives
 Edgar Snyder (1966) – personal injury attorney
 Jon Soltz (GSPIA 2010) – chairman and co-founder of VoteVets.org
 Wilkins F. Tannehill (Academy student) – author, Whig politician, first mayor of Nashville, Tennessee
 Richard Thornburgh (law degree) – U.S. Attorney General, Governor of Pennsylvania
 Harve Tibbott – Republican member of the United States House of Representatives from Pennsylvania
 Tshering Tobgay (ENGR 1990) – Prime Minister of Bhutan (2013–2018)
 Debra Todd (Law 1982) – Justice on Pennsylvania Supreme Court (2007–present)
 James A. Traficant Jr. – convicted U.S. representative from Ohio
 Aliyu Wamakko – former governor of Sokoto State in Nigeria (2007–2015)
 Mary Jo White - (J.D. 1967) - Pennsylvania State Senator
 William Wilkins – student in Pittsburgh Academy (forerunner to Pitt), U.S. Senator (1831–1834); minister to Russia (1834–35); Secretary of War (1844–45)
 James A. Wright (1927) – U.S. Representative (1941–1945)
 Albert Wynn (A&S 1973) – Democratic member of U.S. House of Representatives
 Joseph "Chip" Yablonski (1965) – attorney, NFL Players Association; son of murdered labor leader Joseph Yablonski
 Young Woo Kang (master's and Ph.D degrees) – member of National Council On Disability
 Chris Zurawsky (A&S 1987, GSPIA 2005) – journalist; director of communications and public affairs for Association of American Cancer Institutes; political candidate

Science, medicine, and technology 

 Engin Arık (MSc 1971, PhD 1976) – Turkish particle physicist who headed the Experimental High Energy Physics group at the Boğaziçi University
 Harry Bisel (MD 1942) – pioneering medical oncologist, founding member of American Association of Clinical Oncology, American Society of Preventative Oncology and American Association for Cancer Education
 Christine L. Borgman (SIS 1974) – information sciences scholar
 Herbert Boyer (PhD) – biochemist; 1990 recipient of National Medal of Science; co-founder of Genentech
 Margaret W. "Hap" Brennecke – NASA metallurgist
 Jane A. Cauley (MPH 1980, DrPH 1983) – epidemiologist, University of Pittsburgh Cancer Institute
 Jingguang Chen (Ph.D.), Chinese-American material scientist
 John Choma (ENGR 1963, 1964, MS 1965, PHD 1969) – Professor and Chair of Electrical Engineering-Electrophysics at University of Southern California
 Bob Colwell (ENGR 1977) – electrical engineer, chief architect on Pentium Pro, Pentium II, Pentium III, and Pentium 4 microprocessors
 Sidney Dancoff (MS 1936) – theoretical physicist known for Tamm–Dancoff approximation method and for nearly developing renormalization method for solving quantum electrodynamics
 Lee Davenport (MS 1940, PhD 1946) – physicist responsible for development and deployment of SCR-584 radar system in World War II
 Catherine D. DeAngelis (MD 1969) – pediatrician; medical educator; first woman editor-in-chief of Journal of the American Medical Association
 G. Michael Deeb (A&S 1971, MD 1975) – cardiothoracic surgeon, Herbert Sloan Collegiate Professor of Surgery, and Director of Multidisciplinary Aortic Clinic at University of Michigan Medical Center
 Emilio del Valle Escalante (PhD 2004) – professor of Latin American/indigenous literature, culture and social movements at University of North Carolina at Chapel Hill
 Bernard Fisher (MD, faculty) – pioneer breast cancer researcher
 Patrick D. Gallagher (MS 1987, PhD 1991) – physicist and 14th director of U.S. Department of Commerce's National Institute of Standards and Technology, Chancellor of the University since 2014
 George Otto Gey (A&S 1921, faculty) – scientist who first propagated the HeLa cell line
 Kevin Guskiewicz (MS EDUC 1992) – sports medicine scholar and MacArthur "Genius" Fellow; among first to identify long-term threats to athletes of multiple concussions
 David Halliday (A&S 1938, MS 1939, PhD 1941) – physicist known for textbooks Physics and Fundamentals of Physics
 Ann M. Hardy (PhD 1983) – Epidemiologist known for her research in AIDs surveillance and tracking and her expertise in human subject ethics
 Jacob Pieter Den Hartog (PhD 1929) – Timoshenko Medal winner for distinguished contributions to field of applied mechanics
 Philip Hench (Med 1920) – 1950 Nobel Prize co-winner in medicine with Mayo Clinic colleague Dr. Kendall, for work on adrenal cortex hormones
 Norman H Horowitz (A&S 1936) – geneticist, worked on genome organization and tests for famous one gene-one enzyme hypothesis, space scientist for Mariner and Viking missions to Mars
 Abul Hussam (PhD Chem 1982) – inventor of Sono arsenic filter
 Theresa J. Kaijage (PhD Social Work 2004) – Tanzanian NGO director and social worker known for HIV research and advocacy
 William Kelly – metallurgy graduate, industrialist and independent developer of Bessemer process
 Ravindra Khattree (PhD) – statistician of Fountain-Khattree-Peddada Theorem fame; author and editor
 Charles Glen King (MS 1920, PhD 1923, faculty) – biochemist noted for isolating vitamin C
 Paul Lauterbur (PhD) – 2003 Nobel Prize winner in medicine for invention of MRI machine
 Benjamin Lee (MS) – elementary particle physicist and head of Theoretical Physics Department at Fermi National Accelerator Laboratory
 Bert W. O'Malley (A&S 1959, Med 1963) – molecular endocrinologist and 2008 National Medal of Science laureate
 Bennet Omalu (MPH 2004) – pathologist noted for discovery of chronic traumatic encephalopathy in football players while at Pitt
 Peter Pusey (PhD 1969) – emeritus professor of physics at University of Edinburgh awarded Rhodia Prize for study of dynamically arrested particulate matter
 Joan Redwing - professor of materials science and engineering and electrical engineering at Pennsylvania State University
 Emily Rice – astronomy professor at City University of New York
 Washington Roebling (not a graduate) – civil engineer known for work on Brooklyn Bridge
 Michelle Rogan-Finnemore (BSc (Hons)) – geologist, legal expert, Antarctic program manager
 John Wistar Simpson (MS) – pioneer in nuclear energy; recipient of Edison Medal

 Rebecca Skloot (MFA) – freelance science writer, author, specializes in science and medicine
 Jesse Leonard Steinfeld (BS) – Surgeon General of the United States, 1969–1973
 Lap-chee Tsui (PhD) – geneticist who identified defective gene that causes cystic fibrosis; president of HUGO, the international organization of scientists involved in Human Genome Project; former Vice-Chancellor of University of Hong Kong
 William E. Wallace (PhD Chem 1941 & faculty) – physical chemist and Guggenheim Fellow who worked on Manhattan Project
 Edward J. Wasp (A&S MS 1962) – Elmer A. Sperry Award-winning engineer and inventor known for developing long distance slurry pipelines
 Cyril Wecht (A&S 1952, Med 1956, LLB 1962, faculty) – forensic pathologist
 John Wheatley (PhD 1952) – Fritz London Memorial Prize winner known for his research on liquid helium-3
 Jerome Wolken (BS 1946, MS 1948, Ph.D. 1949) – biophysicist
 Wu Yundong (PhD 1986) – theoretical organic chemist
 Nancy Zahniser (PhD 1977) – pharmacologist
 Vladimir Zworykin (A&S PhD 1926) – inventor, engineer, pioneer of television technology, sometimes called "father of television"

Other 
 Lisa Mantini (BS), mathematician
 Marie Hochmuth Nichols (BS, MS GAS 1936) – influential rhetorical critic
 Charles D. Provan (student, never graduated) – author of controversial books and articles on Christian topics and holocaust denial
 Harry K. Thaw (never graduated) – murderer and son of coal and railroad baron William Thaw

See also 

 List of University of Pittsburgh faculty

References 

Lists of people by university or college in Pennsylvania
University of Pittsburgh